Balantak is a district in the Banggai regency, Sulawesi, Indonesia. The Balantak people speak the Balantak language. As of 1982 there were an estimate 30,000 Balantak, spread over several districts (the population of Balantak District itself was only 5,966 at the 2020 Census). Traditionally they lived in rectangular houses on stilts over are swidden fields. They raised  fowl goats, rice, yams, taro, and millet. Administration was via local chiefs and the Ternate Sultanate. Ancestor worship has been a feature of their traditional religion and Christianity and Islam have been influential since the turn of the 20th century.

References

Further reading
Frank M. LeBar "Balantak" Ethnic Groups of Insular Southeast Asia, edited by Frank M. LeBar. Vol. 1, Indonesia, Andaman Islands, and Madagascar, Pages 138–139. New Haven: HRAF Press. 1972

Banggai Regency
Districts of Central Sulawesi
Ternate Sultanate